Tiso may refer to:

 Tiso (surname), a surname found in Slovakia, Italy and elsewhere
 Tiso (spider), a spider genus